Raphaël, named for Italian painter Raffaello Sanzio da Urbino, is a cross-browser JavaScript library that draws Vector graphics for web sites. It will use SVG for most browsers, but will use VML for older versions of Internet Explorer. Raphaël currently supports Chrome 5.0+ Firefox 3.0+, Safari 3.0+, Opera 9.5+ and Internet Explorer 6.0+. According to JavaScript analytics service, Libscore, Raphaël is used on over 3,000 websites, including the homepages of Apple's iCloud, Food Network, Cornell, and Philips.

Use 
Raphaël is used by first creating an instance of the Raphaël object, which manages the creation of the canvas. The following examples create a canvas that is 320 pixels wide and 200 pixels high:

// top left of canvas at the viewport's 10,50 coordinate
var r = Raphael(10, 50, 320, 200);

// top left of canvas at the  top left corner of the #example element (in elements where dir="ltr")
var r = Raphael(document.getElementById("example"), 320, 200);

// same as above
var r = Raphael("example", 320, 200);

Once the Raphaël object has been instantiated, its various drawing, resizing and animation methods may be called to build up a vector graphic. This library includes support of Cùfon fonts, a format that turns a given font into a set of vector paths. It is extensible through plugins.

Usage 
The widget is used on the Washington Post and the Times Online websites.

Raphaël is also used by iCloud.com, and by Mass Relevance in the White House.

See also 

 D3.js

References

Further reading

External links
 Raphaël homepage
 Raphaël syntax
 Raphaël: a JavaScript API for SVG
 An introduction to Raphaël
 Raphael.js: javascript vector graphics library for the web

JavaScript visualization toolkits
JavaScript libraries
Free software programmed in JavaScript
Software using the MIT license
2008 software